The Central Expressway (E04), is an under construction road project that will link the Sri Lankan capital, Colombo, with Dambulla & Kandy. It will provide a fast alternative to the existing A1 Colombo - Kandy & A6 Ambepussa - Trincomalee Highways. The Expressway starts at the Kadawatha Interchange on the E02 Outer Circular Expressway and ends in Dambulla at the A9 Kandy - Jaffna Highway, traversing through Gampaha, Kurunegala & Matale Districts. A link Expressway starting from Pothuhera & ending in Galagedara will provide access to the Kandy District.

The idea was originally proposed by the UNP government under Ranil Wickremesinghe. In 2002, a Malaysian company had discussions with the then United National Party (UNP) government over the Kandy-Colombo Expressway. However the project was not able to commence due to the elections and the fall of the UNP government. The expressway was supposed to connect the Western Region Megapolis project with the "Greater Kandy Development Project" both projects were also cancelled after the fall of the government.

In November 2013 the Project Minister for Highways announced that construction work on the expressway now known as the Northern Expressway would commence in January 2015. The first phase of the works will link the E03 expressway at Kadawatha through to Kurunegala via Ederamulla and Mirigama. The next stage will see the road extended to Katugastota in Kandy. The Minister advised that the expressway would be built in three stages with financial assistance from China.

On 14 December 2014 the President Mahinda Rajapaksa, launched the construction of the expressway by laying a foundation stone at the Senkadagala entrance of the expressway. The total cost of the expressway was estimated to be approximately Rs.200 billion and the works were scheduled to be completed by 2018. After the new government came into power in 2015, expressway was re-named back to the 'Central Expressway' from 'Kandy Expressway', Prime Minister Ranil Wickramasinghe again launched the construction of the expressway by laying a foundation stone in February 2017 with the first phase expected to be completed in 2.5 years. The final environment impact assessment made by May 2016.

The second stage of the project, which connects Meerigama to Kurunegala was opened to the public on 15 January 2022.

Construction 
Construction of the Central Expressway  will be carried out in four Stages as follows:

Stage 1 - Kadawatha (0.0 km) to Meerigama (37.1 km)
Stage 2 - Meerigama (37.1 km) to Kurunegala (76.8 km) and Ambepussa link road (9.3 km)
Stage 3 - Pothuhera (0.0 km) to Galagedara (Kandy) (32.5 km)
Stage 4 - Kurunegala (76.8 km) to Dambulla (137.1 km)

Stage 1
There are proposed interchanges at Kadawatha, Gampaha, Veyangoda and Mirigama, with fifty overpasses and thirty underpasses along the route. The initial estimated cost of Phase One was approx. Rs. 70bn, with more recent costs estimated at Rs.130bn. Then Prime Minister, now President Ranil Wickramasinghe launched the construction of the expressway by laying a foundation stone in August 2015 for this phase. The project completion was delayed which the Government has already incurred a loss of around Rs. 30 billion as a result.

Stage 2
Interchanges are proposed at Dewalegama, Rambukkana, Hetharaliyadda and Hedeniya. The tentative cost of construction for Phase Two is Rs. 90.0bn. Prime Minister Ranil Wickramasinghe launched the construction of the expressway by laying a foundation stone in February 2017 for this Phase and will be completed in 2021 This Phase will be totally completed by local construction companies for the 1st time in Sri Lanka.

Stage 3
Cost for this stage 3 stretch of the expressway has been estimated at Rs.135 billion. Awarding of the contract for Central Expressway Stage III have stirred up questions and controversy. It was revealed that funding for the third phase also from commercial loan with a high interest rates. President Maithripala Sirisena had said the tender procedure was violated when awarding the contract for the expressway. In September 2017, Prime Minister Ranil Wickramasinghe had to make a parliament statement regarding this. The construction was re-commenced in Dec. 2020 by PM Mahinda Rajapaksha.

Interchanges

See also

References

Highways in Sri Lanka